Bletia gracilis is a species of orchid found in Guatemala, Honduras and Mexico.

References

External links 

gracilis
Orchids of Guatemala
Orchids of Honduras
Orchids of Mexico
Plants described in 1833